Kumara Padmanabha Sivasankara Menon Sr.  (18 October 1898 – 22 November 1982), usually known as K. P. S. Menon, was a diplomat and diarist, a career member of the Indian Civil Service. He was appointed independent India's first Foreign Secretary, serving from 1948 to 1952.

He was Dewan (Prime Minister) of Bharatpur State, Ambassador of India to the Soviet Union from 1952 to 1961, and Ambassador to the  Republic of China before 1948. In 1948, preceding events of the Korean War, the United Nations appointed him the Chairman of the UN Commission on Korea (UNCOK). 

Menon's overland trip from Delhi to Chungking across the Himalayas, the Karakorams and the Pamirs during the Second World War was recorded in his book Delhi-Chungking: A Travel Diary (1947). He was a signatory on behalf of India at the formation of the United Nations. He was a member of the Royal Central Asian Society.

Early life
K. P. S. Menon was born in Kottayam, Travancore, British India (present-day Kerala, India) in 1898 in a distinguished aristocratic family. His father Kumara Menon was a lawyer from Ottapalam. His mother Janaki Amma came from Vellayani near Thiruvananthapuram in Travancore, a niece of Kesava Pillai of Kandamath and cousin of Neyyattinkara N. K. Padmanabha Pillai. Upon her marriage to Kumara Menon, in a previously unprecedented manner (see Matrilineality in Kerala society), she moved to Kottayam to set up house with Kumara Menon who himself had moved away from his family in Ottapalam. The children were also given titles from their father's side and not from the mother's side. He attended Madras Christian College and then University of Oxford, where he was a contemporary of the future Prime Minister Anthony Eden and served as co-officers of the Asiatic Society. He served as the president of the Oxford Majlis Asian Society. He was admitted to the Middle Temple on 30 November 1918, but withdrew without being Called to the Bar on 15 March 1928.

Public service career
In 1922, Menon secured the first rank in the combined Civil Services Examination and joined the ICS. He served as Sub-Collector of Tirupattur, Vellore District, then as District Magistrate in Trichy, Agent of the Government of India at Fort Sandeman, now Zhob, in Baluchistan, in the North West Frontier Province and Ceylon, then as Resident of India in Hyderabad State. In 1934, he was sent as Crown Representative to investigate the state of Indians in Zanzibar, Kenya and Uganda. As Dewan of Bharatpur State, he was appointed a Companion of the Order of the Indian Empire in the New Year Honours of 1943.  After independence, he was India's first Foreign Secretary from 1948 to 1952, then Ambassador of India to the Soviet Union, Hungary and Poland from 1952 to 1961, being the last foreigner to see the alive Stalin in person (on February 13, 1953). On retirement, he was a member and later Chairperson of the Union Public Service Commission.

Menon married Saraswathi, the daughter of C. Sankaran Nair. His son, who bore the same name as him, served as envoy to China and his grandson Shivshankar Menon was Ambassador to China, Foreign Secretary and later the National Security Advisor.

Menon was awarded the Padma Bhushan in 1958 and the Lenin Peace Prize.

Works
Menon's published writings include:

  Many Worlds: An Autobiography
  Many Worlds Revisited - updated autobiography
  Delhi-Chungking: A Travel Diary (1947)
  Russian Panorama
  The Friendship of Great Peoples (1962)
  The Flying Troika (1963)
  The Resurgence of India: Reformation Or Revolution? Sardar Vallabhbhai Patel Memorial Lectures (1963)
  India & the Cold War (1966)
  Journey Round the World (1966)
  Biography of Sir Chettur Sankaran Nair
  Lenin through Indian Eyes (1970)
  Russia Revisited (1971)
  The Lamp and the Lampstand
  Twilight in China (1972)
  The Indo-Soviet Treaty: Setting & Sequel (1972)
  A Diplomat Speaks (1974)
  Yesterday and Today (1975) - a collection of articles, illustrated by Abu Abraham
  Changing Patterns of Diplomacy- Dr. Saiyidain Memorial Lectures (1977)
  Memories and Musings (1979)
  One Thousand Full Moons (Published posthumously in 1987)

References

Indian civil servants
Indian Civil Service (British India) officers
Lenin Peace Prize recipients
1898 births
1982 deaths
Companions of the Order of the Indian Empire
Ambassadors of India to China
People from Ottapalam
Malayali people
Ambassadors of India to the Soviet Union
Indian Foreign Secretaries
Indian Hindus
Recipients of the Padma Bhushan in civil service
University of Madras alumni
CMS College Kottayam alumni
Alumni of Christ Church, Oxford
Indian expatriates in Kenya